Roxanne Avent (born 21 June 1976) is an American film producer and movie studio executive.

Career
Avent has produced several films, including Meet the Blacks, starring Mike Epps, George Lopez, Mike Tyson, Snoop Dogg, Bresha Webb and Zulay Henad. She is the co-founder of Hidden Empire Film Group (HEFG) alongside her partner Deon Taylor. The company supplies commercial projects for studios and major independents worldwide. She is the producer of the award-winning film Supremacy starring Danny Glover, Derek Luke, Evan Ross and Lela Rochon. She is also the producer of Chain Letter, The Hustle and Dead Tone.

Before running HEFG, Avent worked for the Directors Guild of America. She also served as a label manager for Taylor Made Muzik, the largest independent record label in North California.

Filmography

References

External links

Living people
1976 births
Businesspeople from Portland, Oregon
Film producers from Oregon